Blessing Muzarabani (born 2 October 1996) is a Zimbabwean cricketer. He made his first-class debut for Rising Stars in the 2017–18 Logan Cup on 4 October 2017.

Early and domestic career
Blessing Muzarabani was born in Murewa, a small town in Zimbabwe. Later his family moved to Highfield, a suburb in Harare. When he was seven years old, he started cricket training at Takashinga Cricket Club. This is where his talent was spotted by coaches. In 2017, he was chosen by Tatenda Taibu for the Rising Stars Academy to tour England for three months.

In December 2020, he was selected to play for the Southern Rocks in the 2020–21 Logan Cup.

In June 2021, Multan Sultans added Muzarabani to their squad, replacing Obed McCoy, for the remaining matches in the 2021 Pakistan Super League (PSL). He played in six matches and took ten wickets for his team, with the Multan Sultans winning their first PSL title.

International career
In December 2017, he was named in Zimbabwe's Test squad for their one-off Test against South Africa. He made his Test debut for Zimbabwe against South Africa in the Boxing Day Test on 26 December 2017.

In January 2018, he was named in Zimbabwe's One Day International (ODI) squad for the tri-series in Bangladesh. He made his ODI debut for Zimbabwe against Bangladesh on 15 January 2018. 

In February 2018, he was named in Zimbabwe's Twenty20 International (T20I) squad for their series against Afghanistan in the UAE. He made his T20I debut for Zimbabwe against Afghanistan on 5 February 2018.

Following the conclusion of the 2018 Cricket World Cup Qualifier tournament, the International Cricket Council (ICC) named Muzarabani as the rising star of Zimbabwe's squad.

In August 2018, Muzarabani made himself unavailable for national selection for Zimbabwe, instead wishing to further his career in England. The following month, he signed a three-year deal with the English side Northamptonshire as a Kolpak player.

He then returned to play for Zimbabwe after his time in County Cricket. On 3 November 2020, in the third match against Pakistan, Muzarabani took his first five-wicket haul in ODI cricket.

References

External links
 

1996 births
Living people
Zimbabwean cricketers
Zimbabwe Test cricketers
Zimbabwe One Day International cricketers
Zimbabwe Twenty20 International cricketers
Rising Stars cricketers
Northamptonshire cricketers
Sportspeople from Harare
Mashonaland Eagles cricketers
Multan Sultans cricketers
Southern Rocks cricketers